James McFadzean (20 August 1938 – 24 February 2016) was a Scottish footballer who played as a forward.

McFadzean is best known for his part in the 1964-65 title winning Kilmarnock squad while making 128 appearances for the Rugby Park club. He had earlier spells with Heart of Midlothian, St Mirren and Raith Rovers and later joined Ayr United where he ended his playing career.

McFadzean died on 24 February 2016 at the age of 77.

References

1938 births
2016 deaths
Scottish footballers
Heart of Midlothian F.C. players
St Mirren F.C. players
Raith Rovers F.C. players
Kilmarnock F.C. players
Ayr United F.C. players
Footballers from Kilmarnock
Association football forwards